Romania competed at the 1936 Winter Olympics in Garmisch-Partenkirchen, Germany.

Alpine skiing

Men

Bobsleigh

Cross-country skiing

Men

Men's 4 x 10 km relay

Figure skating

Men

Pairs

Ski jumping

References
	
	
 Olympic Winter Games 1936, full results by sports-reference.com

Nations at the 1936 Winter Olympics
1936
Olympics